Bhagwa or Bhagwah is a Tehsil in Doda district of the Indian union territory of Jammu and Kashmir. The town is located 14 kilometres from the district headquarters Doda.

Demographics
According to the 2011 census of India, Bhagwah has 1088 households. The literacy rate of Bhagwa village was 52.46% compared to 67.16% of Jammu and Kashmir. In Bhagwah, Male literacy stands at 67.16% while the female literacy rate was 37.87%.

Transportation

Road
Bhagwa is 14 km away from the district headquarters Doda. Doda is connected by the NH 244.

Rail
The nearest major railway station is Udhampur railway station located 140 kilometres from Bhagwa.

Air
The nearest airport Is Jammu Airport located 200 kilometres from Bhagwa.

See also
Jammu and Kashmir
Doda district
Doda

References

Villages in Doda district

Chenab Valley